Princess Elizabeth Avenue, is an arterial road in central Edmonton, Alberta, Canada, that runs on a southwest to northeast path, cutting through the city's normal grid pattern. It skirts just to the south of Blatchford (formerly Edmonton City Centre Airport), and passes Kingsway Mall and the Northern Alberta Institute of Technology. Prior to the opening of Yellowhead Trail in the early 1980s, Highway 16 followed Princess Elizabeth Avenue between 118 Avenue and 109 Street before continuing west on 111 Avenue.

Prior to 1951, the street was called Portage Avenue. During the 1951 royal tour of Canada, the Princess Elizabeth and Philip, Duke of Edinburgh, visited Edmonton, and the street was renamed in her honour. In 1939, her father, King George VI, visited Edmonton, prompting the naming of the adjacent Kingsway (Avenue).

Neighbourhoods
List of neighbourhoods that Princess Elizabeth Avenue runs through, from west to east.
Blatchford
Prince Rupert
Spruce Avenue
Alberta Avenue
Westwood

Major intersections
This is a list of major intersections, starting at the west end of Princess Elizabeth Avenue.

See also 

 Transportation in Edmonton

References

Roads in Edmonton